Sacred Heart Greenwich, formally known as the Convent of the Sacred Heart, is a private, independent Catholic all-girls 
college-preparatory school from kindergarten through twelfth grade with a coed preschool and prekindergarten located in Greenwich, Connecticut.  As an independent day school, it is privately operated within the Roman Catholic Diocese of Bridgeport and accepts students from throughout Fairfield and Westchester County. It serves students ages 3–18 in preschool through twelfth grade.

Accreditation
Convent of the Sacred Heart is accredited by the New England Association of Schools and Colleges and is approved by the Connecticut State Board of Education. They are also a member of the National Association of Independent Schools, the College Board, the Connecticut Association of Independent Schools, the National Coalition of Girls’ Schools and the Network of Sacred Heart Schools in the United States.

Alumnae
 Margaret Brennan, Class of 1998. Moderator of Face the Nation
 Rosario Kennedy, former deputy mayor of the City of Miami, Florida

References

External links
 
 Roman Catholic Diocese of Bridgeport

Catholic secondary schools in Connecticut
Catholic schools in Connecticut
Roman Catholic Diocese of Bridgeport
Buildings and structures in Greenwich, Connecticut
Schools in Fairfield County, Connecticut
Educational institutions established in 1848
Sacred Heart schools in the United States
Girls' schools in Connecticut
Private middle schools in Connecticut
Private elementary schools in Connecticut
1848 establishments in Connecticut